RBU may refer to:

 Rabindra Bharati University in West Bengal, India
 Rayat-Bahra University in Punjab, India
 RBU (radio station), a longwave time signal transmitted from Moscow on 66.66 kHz
 RBU-6000 Smerch-2, a 213 mm caliber Soviet anti-submarine rocket launcher
 Rock Band Unplugged, a rhythm game for PlayStation Portable
 Russian Biathlon Union
 Riksförbundet för rörelsehindrade barn och ungdomar, handicap organization in Sweden